Panna can refer to:

 Paññā is Pali for "wisdom"; the Sinhala version is Prajñāva

Food
 Aam panna, an Indian drink made from mangoes
 Panna cotta ("cooked cream"), an Italian dessert
 Panna (water), an Italian bottled water

Places
 Panna, India, a city in the state of Madhya Pradesh
 Panna district, a district in Sagar Division of Madhya Pradesh, India
 Panna State, a princely state of the British Raj, India
 Panna National Park, in Madhya Pradesh, India

People
 Panna Rittikrai (1961–2014), Thai martial arts action choreographer, film director, screenwriter and actor
 Panna Udvardy, Hungarian tennis player
 Panna, Hindi-language actress in the 1935 film Bombay Mail
 Panna, a Hungarian nickname for the given name Anna

Other uses
 Panna (fish), a genus of fish in the family Sciaenidae
 Panna (football), a technique in association football

See also
Pana (disambiguation)
Penna (disambiguation)